Discharge is a studio album by English hardcore punk band Discharge, released in 2002 on Sanctuary Records. It is the final album with singer Cal Morris.

Track listing
"You Deserve Me" (1:55)
"Almost Alive" (2:15)
"Corpse of Decadence" (2:19)
"Trust 'Em" (1:49)
"M.A.D" (1:52)
"Accessories by Molotov" (2:20)
"Into Darkness" (2:02)
"Hype Overload" (2:48)
"You" (2:39)
"What Do I Get" (2:24)
"Hell Is War" (1:42)
"Accessories by Molotov Remix" (3:24)
"Corpse of Decadence Remix" (3:29)

Personnel
Vocals: Cal
Guitar: Bones
Bass: Rainy
Drums/backing vocals: Tez
Mixing: Pete Coleman
Engineering: Pete Coleman
Asst. engineering: Martin Wilding
Mastering: Blackham

References

2002 albums
Discharge (band) albums
Sanctuary Records albums